Fiddler: A Miracle of Miracles is a 2019 American documentary film about the creation and significance of the 1964 musical Fiddler on the Roof. Directed by Max Lewkowicz, it features interviews with Fiddler creators such as Jerry Bock, Sheldon Harnick, Joseph Stein, and Harold Prince, as well as scholars, actors, and other musical theatre figures such as Stephen Sondheim and Lin-Manuel Miranda. The documentary includes rarely-seen footage of the original Broadway cast as well as interviews with creators, actors, theatrical figures, and scholars.

This film is dedicated to the memory of Harold Prince, who died during production.

Synopsis
Through the presentation of first-hand accounts, archival footage, and analysis by scholars and prominent musical theater figures, Fiddler: A Miracle of Miracles explores the creative process and cultural significance of the Broadway musical Fiddler on the Roof. First-hand accounts chronicle the personalities of the original Broadway cast and creators. Scholars examine the play's themes of xenophobia, gender equality, civil rights, and religion. These themes are used to contextualize the musical and its cultural impact within the lens of 1960s New York. Jewish actors discuss the play's impact on their identity. Interviews with productions from around the world demonstrate the universal appeal and international legacy of the play.

Creative team
Max Lewkowicz- Director/ Screenplay
Valerie Thomas - Screenplay
Tess Martin - Animation
Joseph Borruso - Editor
Jan Lisa Huttner - Story Consultant
Alisa Solomon - Story Consultant

Interviewees

Creators 

Harold Prince - producer of the original show
Jerry Bock - composer
Joseph Stein - book writer
 Sheldon Harnick - lyricist

Family 
 Harry Stein - son of Joseph Stein
Josh Mostel - son of Zero Mostel, the original Tevye
Marc Aronson - son of Boris Aronson, the original set designer
Michael Bernardi - son of Tevye replacement Herschel Bernardi, understudied Tevye in the 2015 Broadway revival

Original cast (1964) 
 Austin Pendleton - the original Motel
 Joanna Merlin - the original Tzeitel

Film adaptation (1971) 
Topol - portrayed Tevye in the West End and in the film
Norman Jewison - director of the film
Rosalind Harris - portrayed Tzeitel in the film
Neva Small - portrayed Chava in the film

Broadway revival (2004) 
 Harvey Fierstein - Tevye replacement in the 2004 Broadway revival

Broadway revival (2015) 
Adam Kantor - portrayed Motel in the 2015 Broadway revival
Alexandra Silber - portrayed Tzeitel in the 2015 Broadway revival
Bartlett Sher - director of the 2015 Broadway revival
Danny Burstein - portrayed Tevye in the 2015 Broadway revival
Jessica Hecht - portrayed Golde in the 2015 Broadway revival
Kelly Hall-Tompkins - concertmistress/soloist of the 2015 Broadway revival
Melanie Moore - portrayed Chava in the 2015 Broadway revival
Ted Sperling - music director/conductor of the 2015 Broadway revival

Yiddish production (2018) 
 Joel Grey - director of the 2018 Yiddish production
Steven Skybell - portrayed Tevye in the 2018 Yiddish production

Additional contributors 
 Alisa Solomon - author of Wonder of Wonders: A Cultural History of Fiddler on the Roof
Amanda Vaill - author of Somewhere: The Life of Jerome Robbins
Charles Isherwood - New York Times Theater Critic
Fran Leibowitz - Manhattan Raconteur
Gurinder Chadha - director of Bend it Like Beckham
Jan Lisa Huttner - author of Diamond Fiddler: New Traditions for a New Millennium
Jeremy Dauber - author of The Worlds of Sholem Aleichem: The Remarkable Life and Afterlife of the Man Who Created Tevye
Lin-Manuel Miranda - creator of In The Heights and Hamilton (musical)
Stephen Sondheim - American composer and lyricist
Nathan Englander - author of The Ministry of Special Cases
Ted Chapin - author of Everything Was Possible: The Birth of the Musical Follies

Reception
Fiddler: A Miracle of Miracles received critical acclaim. The website's consensus reads, "Fiddler: A Miracle of Miracles takes a delightfully engaging look at the history of a beloved musical and its deep cultural impact." On Metacritic, it has a score of 80 out of 100, based on 11 critics.

Peter Travers, reviewing the film for Rolling Stone, gave it a rating of four out of five stars and called it "essential viewing". In a review for The New York Times, Jason Zinoman praised the film's ability to portray the early days of Fiddlers composition, but noted that it avoids "any serious grappling with criticism of the show".

References

External links
 
 
 

Fiddler on the Roof
American documentary films
2019 films
Films about musical theatre
Documentary films about Broadway theatre
2010s English-language films
2010s American films